Holy Cross Cemetery is a Roman Catholic cemetery located at 14611 Mark Messier Trail NW in Edmonton, Alberta, Canada.  The cemetery is owned and operated by the Roman Catholic Archdiocese of Edmonton and was opened by the archdiocese in 1954.

List of notable interments
 Johnny Bright (1930–1983), Canadian Football League player
 Gord Hannigan (1929–1966), Toronto Maple Leafs hockey player (1952–56)
 William "Wild Bill" Hunter (1920–2002), hockey player, coach, and businessman.  Founder of the NHL Edmonton Oilers

 Joseph MacNeil (1924–2018), archbishop of the Archdiocese of Edmonton (1973–1999)
 Rollie Miles (1927–1995), Canadian Football League player (1951–1961), educator

Cemeteries in Alberta
Roman Catholic cemeteries in Canada
Buildings and structures in Edmonton
Cemeteries established in the 1950s
1954 establishments in Alberta